The Sierra Ladrones Formation is a geologic formation exposed near the Rio Grande Valley in New Mexico. It preserves fossils of Pliocene to Pleistocene age.

Description
The formation consists of three facies representing different depositional environments. These are piedmont slope and alluvial fan deposits, typically composed of light-brown to light-reddish-brown sandstone and fanglomerate; axial stream deposits, which are composed of light-gray to light-yellowish-brown fine- to medium-grained sand and sandstone with fluvial cross-bedding and cut-and-fill channels; and interbedded basalt flows with a K-Ar age of 4.5 +/-0.1 million years (Ma. The formation unconformably overlies or is in fault contact with the Popotosa Formation or older formations. Its age is early Pliocene to middle Pleistocene (2 Ma to 5 Ma.)

The formation is interpreted as fanglomerates shed from the flanking uplifts of the Rio Grande Rift and channel and floodplain deposits of the ancestral Rio Grande.

Fossils
The formation has yielded abundant fossils of Irvingtonian age at Tijeras Arroyo, south of Albuquerque International Airport. These include Hypolagus, Equus, Mammuthus, and Hesperotestudo.

History of investigation
The formation was defined by M.N. Machette in 1978 for exposures in the Sierra Ladrones, a range of low foothills of the Ladron Mountains, in the Sevilleta National Wildlife Refuge.

The formation was subsequently mapped into the lower Rio Puerco valley and as far north as the Santo Domingo basin.

Footnotes

See also

 List of fossiliferous stratigraphic units in New Mexico
 Paleontology in New Mexico

References
 
 
 
 
 

Neogene formations of New Mexico